Keva or KEVA may refer to:

 Keva (mythology), a character in the Fenian Cycle of Irish mythology
 Keva (pension agency), a Finnish pension agency
 Keva Bethel (1935–2011), Bahamian educator
 KEVA (1240 AM), a defunct radio station located in Evanston, Wyoming
 KEVA planks, wooden toys
 Kevā, a village in Iran

See also